"", also known by its official title of "State Anthem of Ukraine" or by its shortened form "", is the national anthem of Ukraine. It is one of the state symbols of the country.

The lyrics constitute a slightly modified version of the first stanza of a patriotic poem written in 1862 by the poet Pavlo Chubynsky, a prominent ethnographer from Kyiv. In 1863, Mykhailo Verbytsky, a Ukrainian composer and Greek-Catholic priest, composed music to accompany Chubynsky's text. The first choral performance of the piece was at the Ukraine Theatre in Lviv, in 1864.

In the first half of the 20th century, during unsuccessful attempts to gain independence and create a state from the territories of the Russian Empire, Poland, and Austria-Hungary, the song was the national anthem of the Ukrainian People's Republic, the West Ukrainian People's Republic, and Carpatho-Ukraine. A competition was held for a national anthem following Ukraine's secession from the Soviet Union, with one of the songs being "Za Ukrainu" by the Ukrainian writer and actor Mykola Voronyi. "" was officially adopted by Ukraine's Verkhovna Rada (parliament) on 15 January 1992. The official lyrics were adopted on 6 March 2003 by the Law on the Anthem of Ukraine.

History

Background

The Ukrainian national anthem can be traced back to one of the parties of the Ukrainian ethnographer and poet Pavlo Chubynsky that occurred during the autumn of 1862. Scholars think that the Polish national song "Poland Is Not Yet Lost" (""), which dates back to 1797, and which later became the national anthem of Poland and the Polish Legions, also had an influence on Chubynsky's lyrics. "" was popular among the nations of the former Polish–Lithuanian Commonwealth that were at that time fighting for their independence; the January Uprising started a few months after Chubynsky wrote his lyrics. According to a memoirist who was present, Chubynsky wrote the lyrics spontaneously while listening to Serbian students sing a hymn—possibly "Hey, Slavs", which is influenced by the Polish national anthem—during a gathering of Serbian and Ukrainian students in a Kyiv apartment.

Chubynsky's words were rapidly taken up by the earliest Ukrainophiles. In 1862, the head gendarm Prince Vasily Dolgorukov exiled Chubynsky to Arkhangelsk Governorate for the "dangerous influence on the minds of commoners".

The poem was first officially published in 1863, when it appeared in the fourth issue of the Lviv journal ; the journal mistakenly attributed the anthem to Taras Shevchenko. It became popular in the territories which now form part of Western Ukraine, and came to the attention of a member of the Ukrainian clergy, Mykhailo Verbytsky of the Greek-Catholic Church. Inspired by Chubynsky's poem, Verbytsky, then a prominent composer in Ukraine, decided to set it to music. The poem was first published with Verbytsky's sheet music In 1865.

The first recording of this anthem (then spelled "") in Ukrainian was released on a gramophone record by Columbia Phonograph Company during World War I in 1916. As a folk song it was performed by a Ukrainian emigrant from Lviv and New York resident Mychajlo Zazulak in 1915.

Early use
Chubynsky's poem wasn't used as a state anthem until 1917, when it was adopted by the Ukrainian Republic. Still, even between 1917 and 1921, this anthem was not legislatively adopted as an exclusive state anthem as other anthems were also used at the time.

Ukraine's anthem during the Soviet period

In 1922, the Ukrainian SSR signed the Treaty on the Creation of the USSR with the Russian SFSR, Transcaucasian SFSR and Byelorussian SSR, which created the Soviet Union. Following the signing of the treaty, the anthem was banned by the Soviet regime. The authorities later decided that each separate Soviet republic could have its own anthem, but "" was rejected in an attempt to help to suppress separatist sentiments held by Ukrainian Nationalists. In 1939, "" was adopted as the official state anthem of Carpatho-Ukraine.

After Joseph Stalin ordered The Internationale to be replaced with a new Soviet anthem in 1944, the other republics of the union were expected to produce their own as well. The Ukrainian government established a commission on the anthem in February 23, 1944. Soviet authorities, after a period of struggle, successfully persuaded public intellectuals to create an anthem with lyrics fitting their political interests and music sterile of any Ukrainian national elements. On February 23, the Ukrainian chairman Mykhailo Hrechukha started a meeting by reading a synopsis of the anthem-to-be in front of musicians and litterateurs: The Ukrainian nation's union with the Soviets were envisaged for the first stanza; the Ukrainian people, their struggles, and freedom under Lenin and Stalin were envisaged for the second stanza; Ukraine's economic and political flourishing in the union were envisaged for the third stanza. A refrain was conceived to be played after each stanza, which was considered as a paean to the union of the Soviet peoples and the reunited Ukraine following the Soviet annexation of Eastern Galicia and Volhynia.

Composers worked on the score prior to the decision on the lyrics; by February 1945, 11 composers were selected as finalists. Anton Lebedynets' score won with an overwhelming majority vote and the score was adopted as the music of the new Soviet anthem in November 1949. Earlier in January 1948, the text of the author Pavlo Tychyna and co-author Mykola Bazhan won; due to plagiarism of his text, Oleksa Novytsky demanded to be listed as co-author, but to no avail. On November 21, 1949, the new anthem of the Ukrainian Soviet Socialist Republic was adopted. Borys Yarovynsky edited and reorchestrated the anthem in 1979.

Post-independence
On 15 January 1992, "Ukraine has not yet perished" was adopted by Ukraine's parliament, the Verkhovna Rada, as the national anthem, and was later instituted in the Ukrainian constitution. However, the lyrics for the anthem were not officially adopted until 6 March 2003, when the Verkhovna Rada passed a law on the state anthem of Ukraine, proposed by then president Leonid Kuchma. The law proposed Mykhailo Verbytsky's music and Pavlo Chubynsky's first verse and refrain of his poem "". However, the first stanza of the anthem was to be changed from "" to "".
The law was passed with an overwhelming majority of 334 votes out of 450, with only 46 MPs opposing. Only the members of Socialist Party of Ukraine and Communist Party of Ukraine refrained from voting. The passing of this law finalised Article 20 of the Constitution of Ukraine. The national anthem that up until then had only officially consisted of Mykhailo Verbytsky's music, would henceforth also include the modified lyrics of Pavlo Chubynsky.

The popularity of the Ukrainian anthem has become particularly high in the wake of the Orange Revolution protests of 2004 and Euromaidan of 2013. Ukrainian composer Valentyn Sylvestrov, who participated in Ukrainian protests in Kyiv, characterised the Ukrainian anthem thus:

Since Euromaidan 

During the Euromaidan protests of 2013, the anthem became a revolutionary song for the protesters. In the early weeks of the protests, they sang the national anthem once an hour, led by singer Ruslana. In World Affairs, Nadia Diuk argues that the national anthem was used as "the clarion call of the 'revolution'" during Euromaidan, which added weight to protests that previous ones, such as the Orange Revolution, lacked. In a 2014 survey, after being asked "How has your attitude toward the following changed for the last year?", the Kyiv International Institute of Sociology found that the attitude towards the Ukrainian national anthem had "improved a lot" in 25.3% of Ukrainians.

In the wake of the Russian invasion of Ukraine in February 2022, many orchestras in Europe and North America performed the anthem in solidarity with Ukraine and its people. Sporting events in Europe and North America have also performed the anthem to show solidarity as well.

Lyrics
"" reminds Ukrainians about its struggle for national self-identity and independence. It was sung as the de facto national anthem at the inauguration of the first President Leonid Kravchuk on 5 December 1991, but it was not until 6 March 2003 that Chubynsky's poem officially became a part of Ukraine's national anthem. The Constitution of Ukraine designated Verbytsky's music for the national anthem on 28 June 1996:

On 6 March 2003, the Verkhovna Rada officially adopted the anthem's lyrics, opting to use only the first verse and chorus from Chubynsky's original poem, while slightly modifying the first stanza. Instead of stating "Ukraine has not yet died, neither her glory, nor her freedom", the opening line now states "The glory of Ukraine has not yet died, nor the will".

Official lyrics (Since 2003)

Proposed lyrics

Chubynsky's original lyrics (1862)
The first stanza of Chubynsky's original poem is somewhat similar to the first stanza of national anthems of Poland and Yugoslavia and "Hatikvah", the national anthem of Israel.

Adaptations
The song "", written as a "song of resistance" during the 2022 Russian invasion of Ukraine, is inspired by the opening motif of the Ukrainian national anthem.

See also

 Prayer for Ukraine
 Zaporizhian March

Notes

References

Sources

Further reading

External links

 National Symbols from President of Ukraine (in Ukrainian)
 
 A orchestral arrangement of the anthem, available to download from the website of St Gregory's Orchestra, Norwich, UK 

National anthems
National symbols of Ukraine
Ukrainian music
1863 songs
Ukrainian patriotic songs
European anthems
National anthem compositions in G minor
National anthem compositions in B-flat major